The Fablok T3A also known as TKh49 or Ferrum 47 / 724 is a class of Polish steam industrial tank locomotive. It was built by Fablok in 1948-1961 years.

History

The locomotive is based on a draft from the years 1927-1929; seven locomotives of the factory designation T1A, basing upon Austrian license, were built by Fablok then. Its development with a superheater was Fablok T2A (Ferrum 29 or Tkh29), of which eleven were built before World War II. The name Ferrum came from Ferrum Ironworks, for which it was developed. The technical documentation survived until after World War II and ten more T2A were manufactured. Due to big need of industrial locomotives in looted post-war Poland, it was decided to develop it into a simplified class of locomotive, factory name T3A or Ferrum 47, from 1947 year. Among other it lacked a superheater. At least 437 examples were made in the years 1948 - 1961, including 30 to China, 3 to Romania and 3 to Hungary. Some factory records indicate 480 locomotives made, but details are not confirmed. Later production locomotives, with more welding adopted, were referred to as Ferrum 724. In China the locomotives were designated as XK 13 and several examples of the class were reported to be working in 1993, with at least three preserved thereafter. 

These locomotives worked exclusively in industry, like coalmines, ironworks, chemical works, and were usually designated with TKh prefix, meaning 0-6-0T freight locomotives in Polish State Railways  designation system, merged with serial numbers. Only in 1996 one locomotive was acquired by the Polish State Railways (PKP) for its museum depot in Chabówka, and formally designated as PKP class TKh49, namely TKh49-1, thus being the newest PKP steam locomotive.

Preservation

The locomotive TKh49-1 is preserved at the Museum of Vehicles and Railway Technology in Chabówka, whilst thirteen more are in other museums or as monuments. Several are in working condition. After industrial service, several locomotives have been exported to the United Kingdom for use on heritage railways as detailed below.

References

 

0-6-0 locomotives
Fablok locomotives
Railway locomotives introduced in 1948